Volegalea cochlidium, common name the spiral melongena, is a species of large sea snail, a marine gastropod mollusk in the family Melongenidae, the crown conches and their allies.

Description
The size of the adult shell varies between 60 mm and 150 mm.

Distribution
This species occurs in the Eastern Indian Ocean and also off Southern India, in the Pacific Ocean around the Philippines, Vietnam and off Australia (Northern Territory, Queensland, Western Australia)

References

 Linnaeus, C. 1758. Systemae naturae per regna tria naturae, secundum classes, ordines, genera, species, cum characteribus, differetiis, synonymis, locis.v. Holmiae : Laurentii Salvii 824 pp. 
 Iredale, T. 1938. A new name for an old shell. The Australian Zoologist 9: 172 
 Allan, J.K. 1950. Australian Shells: with related animals living in the sea, in freshwater and on the land. Melbourne : Georgian House xix, 470 pp., 45 pls, 112 text figs. 
 Wilson, B. 2002. A handbook to Australian seashells on seashores east to west and north to south. Sydney : Reed New Holland 185 pp. 
 Landau B. & Vermeij G.J. (2013) A new species of Pugilina (Gastropoda, Caenogastropoda, Melongeninae) from the Lower Miocene Cantaure Formation of Venezuela. Basteria 77(4-6): 89–95.

External links
 

 
Gastropods described in 1758
Taxa named by Carl Linnaeus